There were two general elections held in England in 1679:

March 1679 English general election
October 1679 English general election